Simon Brown was the director of music at King's College School in Cambridge from 1999-2014. and was the director of King's Voices from 2001 to 2013.  He was a choral scholar in King's College Choir in the late 1970s, and since then has sung in the choirs of New College, Oxford, Winchester Cathedral, Westminster Abbey and Her Majesty's Chapels Royal (St James' Palace). His teaching career began at Bradford Grammar School in Yorkshire, and was followed by 12 years as Head of Academic and Choral Music at the Purcell School. His time at the Purcell School included conducting the youngest ever choir to sing Tallis' 40-part choral work Spem In Alium.

Brown's work with King's Voices included evensongs in chapel on Mondays in full term, visits to Ely Cathedral and St George's Chapel, Windsor, and tours to Venice, Florence, Paris, Amsterdam, Brussels, Dublin, Copenhagen, Bologna, Rome, Malta, Barcelona, Toulouse and Berlin. Simon is a keen composer (the introit Thee We Adore, O Hidden Saviour, Thee was premiered on BBC Radio 3's Choral Evensong in 2006 and his new carol There is no rose was sung in the Advent Procession at York Minster in 2011) and enjoys playing many instruments including recorder, viola, clarinet and harp. He is also an excellent piano teacher and accompanist.

Since 2015, Brown has been Director of Chapel Music at Robinson College, Cambridge.

References

Year of birth missing (living people)
Living people
English conductors (music)
British male conductors (music)
21st-century classical composers
British classical composers
British male classical composers
Alumni of New College, Oxford
21st-century British conductors (music)
21st-century British male musicians